Újpesti Törekvés Sport Egylet was a Hungarian football club from the town of Újpest, Hungary.

History
Újpesti Törekvés Sport Egylet debuted in the 1923–24 season of the Hungarian League and finished ninth.

Name Changes 
1908–1925: Újpesti Törekvés Sport Egylet
1924: merger with Újpesti SC
1925: merger with Palotai NTE
1925: Újpest-Rákospalotai Törekvés SE
1925: the two clubs separated
1925–1927: Újpesti Törekvés Sport Egylet
1927–1928: Újpesti Törekvés Football Club 
1928–1944: Újpesti Törekvés Sport Egylet
1944: Mátyás Újpesti Törekvés SE
1945–?: Mauthner Újpesti Törekvés SE
1948: merger with Pannónia
1948–1949: Pannónia-UTSE
1949–?: Bőripari Dolgozók SE III.

References

External links
 Profile

Football clubs in Hungary